Talal Al-Khaibari (Arabic:طلال الخيبري) is a Saudi Arabian football left back who played for Saudi Arabia in the 2007 Asian Cup. He also played for Al-Ahli, Al Wehda and Al Qadsiah.

References

External links
 
 

1977 births
Living people
Al-Ahli Saudi FC players
Al-Wehda Club (Mecca) players
Al-Qadsiah FC players
2007 AFC Asian Cup players
Saudi Arabian footballers
Place of birth missing (living people)
Association football fullbacks
Saudi Arabia international footballers
Saudi Professional League players
Saudi First Division League players